Wiggins is a large black residential area in central Durban, KwaZulu-Natal, South Africa.

References

Suburbs of Durban